Anthony Ewoud Jan Modderman (27 September 1838 – 7 August 1885) was a Dutch liberal politician.

Modderman was born in Winschoten, to Hendrik Jacob Herman Modderman and Adriana Sibylla Catharina Emmen. He studied Roman and Contemporary Law in Leiden, graduating in 1863, after which he settled in The Hague to become a lawyer. Modderman was appointed as Minister of Justice on 20 August 1879. As minister, he successfully opposed the reintroduction of the death penalty in 1881. He left office on 23 April 1883 and was given the honorary title of Minister of State six days later. Modderman died in The Hague.

References

External links
 

1838 births
1885 deaths
Dutch jurists
Ministers of Justice of the Netherlands
Ministers of State (Netherlands)
People from Winschoten
Leiden University alumni
Academic staff of the University of Amsterdam
Academic staff of Leiden University
Commanders of the Order of the Netherlands Lion